Elric may refer to:
 Elric of Melniboné, a fictional character created by English writer Michael Moorcock and the protagonist of a series of sword and sorcery stories taking place on an alternative Earth
 Stormbringer (role-playing game) or Elric!, a role-playing game published by Chaosium based on Moorcock's works
 Elric: Battle at the End of Time, the second edition of a board game published by Chaosium (the first and third editions of which were simply titled Elric) based on Moorcock's works
 Edward Elric and Alphonse Elric, the main characters of the anime and manga series Fullmetal Alchemist
 "Elric the Enchanter", a song by the English band Hawkwind from the 1985 album The Chronicle of the Black Sword
 Elric, a technomage character in the Babylon 5 episode "The Geometry of Shadows"

See also
 Elrick (name)